Strathmore F.C.  or Strathmore Football Club may refer to:

 Strathmore F.C. (Arbroath), a defunct Scottish association football club from Arbroath, Angus
 Strathmore F.C. (Dundee), a defunct Scottish association football club from Dundee, Angus
 Strathmore Football Club, an Australian rules football club from Strathmore, Victoria, Australia